The chassé (French for 'to chase'; sometimes anglicized to chasse ) is a waltz ballroom dance figure.  Like chassés in other dances, it involves a triple-step where one foot "chases" the other in a "step-together-step" pattern. It is derived from a ballet step.

Chassé from promenade position

The chassé from promenade position is a Pre-Bronze syllabus figure.

Leader (man)

Follower (lady)

Progressive chassé to right

The progressive chassé to right is a Bronze syllabus figure.  It is progressive because it begins with a forward step.  While it moves to the leader's right, it is a reverse, or left-turning figure.

Leader (man)

Follower (lady)

References

External links
 .

Waltz dance moves